The 1997–98 Turkish Cup was the 36th edition of the tournament that determined the association football Süper Lig Turkish Cup champion under the auspices of the Turkish Football Federation (TFF). champion under the auspices of the Turkish Football Federation (TFF). Beşiktaş successfully contested Galatasaray on both legs of the finals. The results of the tournament also determined which clubs would be promoted or relegated.

First round

Second round

Third round

Fourth round

Fifth round

Sixth round

Quarter-finals

 1While Trabzonspor was leading 1–0, Fenerbahçe leave the field in the 75th minute on the ground that a stone hit the back of Fenerbahçe coach Otto Barić and the match could not be completed. The result was registered as 3–0 in favor of Trabzonspor and Fenerbahçe was given a one-season ban from the cup.

Semi-finals

Summary table 

|}

1st leg

2nd leg

Final

1st leg

2nd leg

See also
 1997–98 1.Lig

References

Turkish Cup seasons
Cup
Turkish